Sidi Aïch is a town in northern Algeria in the Soummam River valley. The Béni Mansour-Bejaïa line traverses this community.

Communes of Béjaïa Province
Cities in Algeria
Algeria